When a work's copyright expires, it enters the public domain. The following is a list of works that enter the public domain in 2024. Since laws vary globally, the copyright status of some works are not uniform.

Countries with life + 70 years
With the exception of Belarus (Life + 50 years) and Spain (which has a copyright term of Life + 80 years for creators that died before 1987), a work enters the public domain in Europe 70 years after the creator's death, if it was published during the creator's lifetime. For previously unpublished material, those who publish it first will have the publication rights for 25 years. The list is sorted alphabetically and includes a notable work of the creator.

Countries with life + 60 years
In Bangladesh, India, and Venezuela a work enters the public domain 60 years after the creator's death.

Countries with life + 50 years
In most countries of Africa and Asia, as well as Belarus, Bolivia, New Zealand, and Uruguay, a work enters the public domain 50 years after the creator's death.

Countries with life + 80 years
Spain has a copyright term of life + 80 years for creators that died before 1987. In Colombia and Equatorial Guinea a work enters the public domain 80 years after the creator's death.

Australia and Canada

In 2004 copyright in Australia changed from a "plus 50" law to a "plus 70" law, in line with the United States and the European Union. But the change was not made retroactive (unlike the 1995 change in the European Union which bought some e.g. British authors back into copyright, especially those who died from 1925 to 1944). Hence the work of an author who died before 1955 is normally in the public domain in Australia; but the copyright of authors was extended to 70 years after death for those who died in 1955 or later, and no more Australian authors will come out of copyright until 1 January 2026 (those who died in 1955).

Similarly, Canada amended its Copyright Act in 2022 from a "plus 50" law to a "plus 70" law, coming into force on December 30, 2022, but not reviving expired copyright. No more new Canadian authors will come out of copyright until 1 January 2043 (those who died in 1972).

United States

Under the Copyright Term Extension Act, books published in 1928, films released in 1928, and other works published in 1928, enter the public domain in 2024. Sound recordings that were published in 1923 enter the public domain.

Unpublished works whose authors died in 1953 enter the public domain.

The earliest incarnation of Mickey Mouse as well as Minnie Mouse enters the public domain work in 2024 through Steamboat Willie and The Gallopin' Gaucho. The House at Pooh Corner by A. A. Milne, including the character Tigger, enters the public domain in 2024. Notable films entering the public domain in the United States include Abie's Irish Rose, Charlie Chaplin's The Circus, In Old Arizona, The Man Who Laughs, Noah's Ark, The Passion of Joan of Arc, The Singing Fool, and Harold Lloyd's final silent feature Speedy.

Additional notable works entering the public domain in the United States include Lady Chatterley's Lover by D. H. Lawrence, Orlando: A Biography by Virginia Woolf, The Well of Loneliness by Radclyffe Hall, Decline and Fall by Evelyn Waugh, The Mystery of the Blue Train by Agatha Christie, Story of the Eye by Georges Bataille, The Threepenny Opera by Bertolt Brecht, and An American in Paris by George Gershwin.

See also
 1953 in literature and 1973 in literature for deaths of writers
 Public Domain Day
 Creative Commons

References

External links
 
 
Popular Books of 1928 at Goodreads

Public domain
Public domain